The 2016 National Disability Survey found that there are approximately 2,683,400 people with disabilities in South Korea. Physical disabilities account for about 50% of the total disabled population. In the past few decades, guided by the five-year plan, policies and services related to people with disabilities have improved. The government has established several regional rehabilitation centers for people with disabilities and has provided and implemented rehabilitation programs in their communities. However, the number of disabled people in South Korea is increasing as the population ages. Regarding this matter, the South Korean government is planning a stable welfare model to adapt to long-term demographic changes.

Demographics
13.9% of disabled South Koreans have their daily lives dependent on the help of others, and 82.4% of them are taken care of by their families. After increasing the number of disabled people's line management benefits in 2011, the use rate of care workers increased by 10.8%, compared with the previous one.

The average monthly income of families with disabilities is about $1,780 (2,000,000 won) and the average monthly expenditure is $1,460 (1,620,000 won), which is about 54% of the average for all households in the country. According to statistics, 72% of the income of disabled people is used for medical related matters. Their unemployment rate is 7.8%, which is twice the total unemployment rate. And the wage level of disabled employees is $1,280 (1,420,000 won), which is only 54.6% of the national average wage ($2,340 or 2,600,000 won).
Before people began to change the status quo of disabled people, due to the conservative and homogeneous nature of the South Korean society, people with disabilities did not receive equality and attention. The South Korean government and social institutions also lacked long-term planning and effective support. In South Korea, the Employment Promotion Law for Persons with Disabilities requires employers with more than 300 employees to retain 2% of jobs for people with disabilities. However, only 0.91% of job positions are held by disabled employees. Many employers are reluctant to hire people with disabilities. Only 11% of people with disabilities have personal computers, and 6.9% use the Internet, which limit their access to information.

In order to change the public's perception of people with disabilities, the Korean Broadcasting System (KBS) produced three special TV programs about disability.

Discrimination 
With the efforts of people with disabilities and stakeholders, many people have begun to call attention to people with disabilities, telling the public what the real life of people with disabilities is, and showing them that people with disabilities can contribute to society. Many countries have also published anti-discrimination laws and the UN Convention on the Rights of Persons with Disabilities. These changes have also occurred in South Korea. However, because of the rapid expansion of the material space and rights awareness of previously isolated, persons with disabilities will face various forms of conflict and discrimination in new interpersonal relationships.

Hansen's disease 
More than half of people with Hansen's disease (leprosy) are accompanied by disability and change the appearance of the patient, which has been rejected and discriminated by most people in the twentieth century. In 2000, the word "leprosy" was replaced by "Hansen disease". On October 11, 2004, in Seoul, the Korean Bar Association hosted a forum to discuss the human rights of Hansen patients. Media reports at the forum stated that more than 400 disabled people, who once had Hansen's disease, gathered together, known as the "Sea of Tears", expressed their experiences and called for special legislation to correct extreme discrimination and their sufferings.

Sexual violence 
In 2001, the slogan of the center for Sexual Violence against Women with Disabilities is "women with disabilities do not want to be the target of sexual violence".

Disability hierarchy and related issues 
In South Korea, disabled people are classified into six levels. Index 1 indicates the most severe degree of disability, and index 6 indicates less serious. In this grading, people without disabilities mean no disability; mild disability means that the disability severity index is between 3 and 6; severely disabled means that the disability severity index is 1 or 2. Mild disability includes people who can take care of themselves, even if some of them require personal support. Severe disabilities include those who are highly dependent on personal assistance or assistive devices. The reason for dividing people with disabilities into serious and minor is that not only do they have different medical needs, but also some benefits are determined by this definition of severity.

Trevor Palmer, an emeritus professor at the University of Sydney and a contributor to the 2011 World Disability Report, said: "From a government perspective, this sounds reasonable, but his fairness cannot be confirmed. The system is completely dependent on medicine, this is an act of oversimplifying disability."

In addition to hoping to abolish the classification system, activists also wish to repeal a law that grants them disability benefits based on the disability or the income of their relatives, which is very unfair to some low-income people. And these allowances are likely not to be used to care for disabled people.

In South Korea, there are also people with disabilities who are severely disabled and whose relatives are unable to take care of them. They are housed in government-established institutions that currently house more than 30,000 people. They are barely exposed to other people in society in their daily lives. This is a permanent perception of their abnormality, and in institutions established specifically for disabled people, people with disabilities still cannot avoid human rights violations.

But at least in these institutions that specialize in disabled people, the facilities they need are basically complete, and people with disabilities cannot get rid of such institutions. Because the outside world lacks infrastructure, housing, employment, and transportation are not enough to meet the needs of disabled people, including both physical and mental needs. There are currently more than 4,000 people waiting on the list. About 70% of applicants are relatives of disabled people, so they can take care of disabled people at home without sacrificing all of their personal lives or work.

On September 5, 2017, under the efforts and persistence of many parties, the Korean disability classification system was finally cancelled. The activists ushered in a short-lived victory, at the same time, a protest was erupting in a district of Seoul, South Korea. Some parents of disabled people asked to establish a disabled school in the local area, while others felt that disabled schools would affect the reputation of this area and the price. Therefore, there is still a long way to go about the issue of disabled people.

Rehabilitation and treatment 
Consistent with the ideas of many countries, South Korea has placed the disabled population in an essential position in our peaceful years. Technology, economics and medical development have confirmed this shift, and many Koreans believe that the ability to transform people with disabilities through biomedical physics is part of society and can show their ability to cure people with disabilities, thereby strengthening the impression of other countries on Korea and establishing a national spirit

To this end, the Korean government has developed and implemented a series of policies and programs aimed at improving the facilities for disabled people and increasing the subsidies for disabled people.

The first plan was to achieve equal treatment of the people with disabilities from 1998 to 2002; to realize the welfare construction of disabled people from 2003 to 2007, such as targeted education and job opportunities; from 2008 to The third plan implemented in 2012 is to continue to develop social inclusion of persons with disabilities, eliminate discrimination, strengthen hardware facilities, and establish a welfare service system centered on persons with disabilities.

After more than 10 years of continuous development, the concept and system of disabled people in Korea has been completely different from the original. Previously limited to physical barriers, now the obstacles caused by the brain, psychological disorders such as autism, surgery or plastic injury are also added to the damage barrier.

National health insurance costs about $765 million in physical therapy equipment for disabled people and in the development of occupational therapy. The government has provided auxiliary equipment for low-income people with disabilities to improve their self-care ability, such as prosthetics and wheelchairs. After 1997, this equipment was also widely added to welfare protection. The household items covered are TV subtitles, audio watches and rehabilitation products such as acne prevention pads and orthopedic shoes. The most commonly used crutches for disabled people with physical disabilities and brain lesions, the use rate of electric wheelchairs increased by 22.3% and 6.9% respectively, 74.3% of deaf people have hearing aids, and more and more people with voice disabilities use an artificial larynx, the patient who has kidney disease uses a dialyzer.

See also
 Deafness in South Korea
 Disability in North Korea
 Human rights in South Korea

References